Osita Okeagu (born 29 November 1978) is a retired Nigerian athlete who specialised in the 400 metres hurdles. He won the gold medal in the event at the 2003 All-Africa Games.

His personal best in the event is 51.55 from 2007.

Competition record

External links
 

Living people
1978 births
Nigerian male hurdlers
African Games gold medalists for Nigeria
African Games medalists in athletics (track and field)
Athletes (track and field) at the 2003 All-Africa Games
Athletes (track and field) at the 2007 All-Africa Games
Competitors at the 2005 Summer Universiade